Ester James Junior III (born December 8, 1959) is a former American football player and coach. He played professionally as a linebacker in the National Football League (NFL) for 13 seasons, from 1981 to 1993, St. Louis/Phoenix Cardinals, Miami Dolphins, Tampa Bay Buccaneers, and Seattle Seahawks. Junior played college football for the University of Alabama, earning consensus selection to the 1980 College Football All-America Team. He was selected in the first round with fifth overall pick of the 1981 NFL Draft by the Cardinals. Junior served as the head football coach at Central State University in Wilberforce, Ohio from 2009 to 2013. He was inducted into the College Football Hall of Fame as a player in 2020.

Early years and family
Junior was born in Salisbury, North Carolina and grew up in Nashville, Tennessee. He and his wife, Yolanda, have eight children: Shandon Hood, Torren Hood, Ashley James, Adam J. Junior, Aja J Junior, E.J. Junior IV, Kyle E. Junior, and Cameron M. Junior.

Playing career

College
Junior attended the University of Alabama, where he played for coach Bear Bryant's Alabama Crimson Tide football team from 1977 to 1980, wearing jersey number 39. In the 1979 opener against Georgia Tech, he returned an interception 59 yards for a touchdown. He finished the season with 5 sacks, 52 tackles, and a blocked punt. As a senior in 1980, he produced 71 tackles and blocked a field goal. He was recognized as a consensus first-team All-American.

Junior was a member of Kappa Alpha Psi fraternity at Alabama.

Professional
He subsequently played for the Miami Dolphins, Tampa Bay Buccaneers and Seattle Seahawks.

Coaching career
Since leaving the NFL, Junior has been the executive director of youth programs in Miami under the NBA's Alonzo Mourning. He also spent time back in the NFL as a coach and in the front office. He was the Seattle Seahawks linebacker coach in 1994 and then was the director of player development programs for the Miami Dolphins from 1996-1998. He has been a minority intern coach for the Minnesota Vikings (2003) and Jacksonville Jaguars (2005) and coached in NFL Europe for the Rhein Fire in Düsseldorf, Germany. On the college setting, he coached the linebackers at the East–West Shrine Bowl in 2005 and 200 .

From 2006 to 2009, Junior was the linebackers coach at Southwest Baptist University in Bolivar, Missouri. He was promoted to defensive coordinator in February 2009, but left a month later to become head coach at Central State University in Wilberforce, Ohio. From 2015 to 2017, he was the defensive line coach at Delaware State University.

Honors
In May 2012, he was inducted into the Alabama Sports Hall of Fame and into the Tennessee Hall of Fame 2010. He made the Senior Bowl Hall of Fame in 2007. Junior was nominated for the College Football Hall of Fame in 2016 but fell short in votes. He was again nominated in June 2017. On March 11, 2020, the College Football Hall of Fame announced the Junior as a member of the 2020 class of inductees.

Head coaching record

References

External links
 

1959 births
Living people
American football defensive ends
American football linebackers
Alabama Crimson Tide football players
Central State Marauders football coaches
Delaware State Hornets football coaches
Miami Dolphins players
Phoenix Cardinals players
Rhein Fire coaches
Seattle Seahawks coaches
Seattle Seahawks players
Southwest Baptist Bearcats football coaches
St. Louis Cardinals (football) players
Tampa Bay Buccaneers players
All-American college football players
College Football Hall of Fame inductees
National Conference Pro Bowl players
People from Salisbury, North Carolina
Players of American football from Nashville, Tennessee
Coaches of American football from Tennessee
African-American coaches of American football
African-American players of American football
20th-century African-American sportspeople
21st-century African-American sportspeople